Michael Erickson (born 15 June 1968) is an Australian former rugby league footballer who played in the 1980s and 1990s. He played his entire ten-season career for the Parramatta Eels.
After the conclusion of his playing career, Erickson was made a life member of the club in 1996.

References

1968 births
Living people
Australian rugby league players
Country New South Wales Origin rugby league team players
Parramatta Eels players
Rugby league players from Taree
Rugby league wingers